Boliqueime is a Portuguese village and freguesia ("civil parish"), located in the municipality of Loulé, in the region of Algarve. The population in 2011 was 4,973, in an area of 46.21 km². The urbanized core of the village is about 50 m to 95 m above sea level. Located in central Algarve, 27 km from Faro International Airport it is a well preserved small village less than 20 minutes away from both the inland city of Loulé, the seat of the municipality, and the coastal settlements of Vilamoura, a famed resort with marina, and Albufeira, a city by the sea with some of the most popular beaches in the region.

Notable people
Aníbal Cavaco Silva, President of Portugal from 2006 to 2016 and Prime Minister of Portugal from 1985 to 1995, was born in this village in 1939.
Lídia Jorge, novelist and author as well as a member of Portugal's Council of State.

Gallery

References

Freguesias of Loulé